The 1947–48 Ranji Trophy was the 14th season of the Ranji Trophy. Holkar won the title defeating Bombay in the final.

Zonal Matches

West Zone

North Zone

South Zone

East Zone

Inter-Zonal Knockout matches

Final

Scorecards and averages
Cricketarchive

References

External links

1948 in Indian cricket
Indian domestic cricket competitions